Oligolepis formosanus is a species of goby found in the Indo-West Pacific.

References

Pezold, P.L. and H.K. Larson, 2015. A revision of the fish genus Oxyurichthys (Gobioidei: Gobiidae) with descriptions of four new species. Zootaxa 3988(1):1-95.

formosanus
Fish of the Pacific Ocean
Taxa named by John Treadwell Nichols
Fish described in 1958